The Kwelera National Botanical Garden is located at the Kwelera Nature Reserve on the Wild Coast of the Eastern Cape. It lies at the mouth of the Kwelera River. It is the 10th national botanical garden established in South Africa and the first in the Eastern Cape.

History 
In 1994, at the mouth and last bend of the Kwelera River  of land opposite the garden was established as a protected area and called the Kwelera Island Local Nature Reserve.

In 2014, 10.48 ha of farmland beside the Kwelera Nature Reserve was purchased by SANBI for the creation of the Kwelera National Botanical Garden. This land was added to the existing Kwelera Nature Reserve which will serve as the natural portion of the botanical garden. It would be jointly managed by SANBI and Eastern Cape Parks.

See also 

 List of protected areas of South Africa

References 

Nature reserves in South Africa
Eastern Cape Provincial Parks